FC Virginia was an American women's soccer team, founded in 2005. The team was a member of the Women's Premier Soccer League, the third tier of women’s soccer in the United States and Canada for just one season, in 2006, after which the team left the league and the franchise was terminated.

The team's coach was Jef Nesbit. Members of the 2006 WPSL team included: Aly Pont, Melissa Krnjaic, Lindsay Alexander, Megan Saunders, Katie Bunch, Rachel Young, Lindsey Miller, Melissa Somadelis, Gina Om, Katie Somadelis, Jasmine Riley, Meghan Flesch, Meghan Lenczyk, Rebecca Zimmerman, Jessica DeStefano, Christina Papageorge, and Stephanie Croghan.

Year-by-year

External links
Official site of F.C. Virginia
Official site of the WPSL

   

Women's Premier Soccer League teams
Women's soccer clubs in the United States
Soccer clubs in Virginia
2005 establishments in Virginia
2006 disestablishments in Virginia